Jonathan Marray and Jamie Murray were the defending champions, but Marray chose not to participate. Jamie Murray partnered with Jeff Coetzee. However, they lost to Rameez Junaid and Niko Karagiannis in the first round.
Farrukh Dustov and Bertram Steinberger defeated Roy Bruggeling and Bas van der Valk 6–4, 6–1 in the finals.

Seeds

Main draw

Draw

References
Main Draw

TEAN International - Doubles
TEAN International